Dennis W. Tippets (born December 30, 1938) was an American politician in the state of Wyoming. He served in the Wyoming House of Representatives as a member of the Republican Party. He attended the University of Colorado and was a mining company executive.
 
He beat the incumbent Dale Urbigkit in the 1984 elections but just 51 votes after a recount.

References

1938 births
Living people
University of Colorado alumni
Businesspeople from Wyoming
Republican Party members of the Wyoming House of Representatives
People from Wheatland, Wyoming